The Territorial Force was established on 1 April 1908 as a volunteer auxiliary to the British Army. It was formed by the amalgamation of the former auxiliary institutions of the Volunteer Force and the yeomanry. Designed primarily as a home defence force, its members could not be compelled to serve overseas unless they volunteered to do so. On the outbreak of the First World War in 1914, many did. The first units were deployed piecemeal in support of the regular army as it defended against the opening German offensive in Belgium and France in 1914. The first territorial divisions to be deployed were used to free up imperial garrisons overseas, but in 1915 they began to be deployed to the front lines on the Western Front and at Gallipoli. The pre-war territorial divisions were numbered in May 1915 in order of their deployment. As they were deployed, second-line divisions were raised to replace them at home, and in 1916 these began to be deployed to combat zones. By the end of the war in 1918, the Territorial Force had provided 28 divisions and 14 mounted brigades.

Infantry divisions

Mounted units
The original mounted brigades were:
 Eastern Mounted Brigade
 Highland Mounted Brigade
 London Mounted Brigade
 Lowland Mounted Brigade
 North Midland Mounted Brigade
 Nottinghamshire and Derbyshire Mounted Brigade
 South Eastern Mounted Brigade
 1st South Midland Mounted Brigade
 2nd South Midland Mounted Brigade
 South Wales Mounted Brigade
 1st South Western Mounted Brigade
 2nd South Western Mounted Brigade
 Welsh Border Mounted Brigade
 Yorkshire Mounted Brigade

A number of yeomanry divisions were also formed:

Other divisions

Also considered divisions of the Territorial Force were:
 71st, 72nd and 73rd Divisions – formed late 1916 as Home Service divisions; all broken up early 1918.
 75th Division – mixed Territorial Force and Indian Army division formed in June 1917.

References

Bibliography
 
 
 
 
 
 

Territorial Force
British Territorial Force
20th-century history of the British Army
British Territorial Force 1914-1918